Emirhan Aydoğan (born 26 June 1997) is a Turkish footballer who plays as a midfielder for Sakaryaspor.

Club career
He made his professional debut in the Süper Lig for Bursaspor on 7 May 2016 in a game against Osmanlıspor.

International
He participated in the 2014 UEFA European Under-17 Championship with the Turkey national under-17 football team.

References

External links
 
 

1997 births
People from Osmangazi
Living people
Turkish footballers
Turkey youth international footballers
Association football midfielders
Bursaspor footballers
Bandırmaspor footballers
İnegölspor footballers
Alanyaspor footballers
Sakaryaspor footballers
Süper Lig players
TFF First League players
TFF Second League players
TFF Third League players